Wheatly (Robinson Motorcycles) Aerodrome  is located  west southwest of Wheatley, Ontario, Canada.

References

Registered aerodromes in Ontario